Andrew Barton (1497/98–1549), of Smithills Hall in Deane, Bolton, Lancashire and Holme, Nottinghamshire, was an English politician.

He was a Member (MP) of the Parliament of England for Lancashire in 1529.

References

1498 births
1549 deaths
English MPs 1529–1536
People from Deane
People from Newark and Sherwood (district)
Members of the Parliament of England (pre-1707) for Lancashire